Stephen Vittoria (born January 11, 1957) is an American filmmaker and author born in Newark, New Jersey who currently resides in Los Angeles, California.

Early life 
Vittoria grew up in West Orange, New Jersey and attended West Orange Mountain High School. In 1973, when he was a 16-year-old high school student, Vittoria petitioned to run for the Board of Education of the West Orange Public Schools. Vittoria wanted student representation on the school board but was denied candidacy. With legal representation from the American Civil Liberties Union, the case went to the Supreme Court of the United States where Justice William J. Brennan, Jr. ruled against Vittoria and the ACLU.

Vittoria graduated Rider University, Lawrenceville, NJ in 1979 and Columbia College, Los Angeles, California 1981, where he studied film.

Career

Feature films 
In 1987, Vittoria wrote and directed his first feature film, Lou, Pat & Joe D (later titled Black & White), starring Frank Vincent and Kim Delgado. Set in Newark, NJ after World War II, the film explores racism as mirrored through the friendship of two young boys.

In 1995, Vittoria produced, wrote, and directed Hollywood Boulevard, starring John C. McGinley, Jon Tenney, and Julianne Phillips—a dark and satirical look at the motion picture business.

In 1996, Vittoria founded Street Legal Cinema—a production company dedicated to documentary filmmaking, as well as Deep Image, a commercial production company. Both companies continue successfully today.

In 2005, Vittoria produced, wrote, and directed the documentary feature film, One Bright Shining Moment: The Forgotten Summer of George McGovern, which won the Jury Prize for "Best Documentary Feature" at the 2005 Sarasota Film Festival and was released in theaters nationwide by First Run Features.

In 2006, Vittoria wrote, directed, and edited the television documentary Keeper of the Flame with journalist Linda Ellerbee and actor Wilford Brimley, examining the ecological crisis facing American forests.

In 2008 and 2011, respectively, Vittoria was segment producer on Gonzo: The Life and Work of Dr. Hunter S. Thompson and Magic Trip: Ken Kesey's Search for a Kool Place, both directed by Alex Gibney.

In 2012, Vittoria produced, wrote, directed, and edited the feature documentary Mumia: Long Distance Revolutionary, released nationally by First Run Features and internationally by Monoduo Films Berlin. The film chronicles the career of imprisoned journalist Mumia Abu-Jamal, both before and during incarceration.

Publications 
In 2018, Vittoria and co-author Mumia Abu-Jamal published volume one of a three-part book series entitled, Murder Incorporated: Empire, Genocide, and Manifest Destiny. The nonfiction series examines and critiques the history of the United States of America, from the arrival of Europeans to the early 21st century, making the argument that the founding and evolution of America as a nation has been driven primarily by conquest, exploitation, and murder.

Volume one in the series, "Dreaming of Empire", features an introduction by journalist Chris Hedges and deals with the early origins of the "American Empire". Topics covered include the role religious faith played in the psyche of early European colonizers; the devastation colonizers brought to the Native American population; the central economic role slavery played in establishing the new nation as a major power; the motives of the American Revolution; the Monroe Doctrine as an informal, but lasting, foundational document of the "American Empire"; and the early imperial expansion of America into Mexico and Latin America.

Still to be released are volumes two and three, "America's Favorite Pastime" and "Perfecting Tyranny", respectively.

"America's Favorite Pastime" scrutinizes America's major wars (World War I, World War II, the Vietnam War), military recruitment, the Central Intelligence Agency, and the Military Industrial Complex.

"Perfecting Tyranny" exposes economic and political systems that the authors argue work to maintain the American Empire from within, while also featuring groups and individuals who have resisted. Themes include the oppression and resistance of Black Americans and women, the Supreme Court, the American News Media, and the ever-expanding security and surveillance state.

References 

1957 births
Living people
American filmmakers
Writers from Newark, New Jersey
People from West Orange, New Jersey
Rider University alumni
West Orange High School (New Jersey) alumni